Line 9 of CRT is a rapid transit line in Chongqing, China.

History 
The line began construction on September 28, 2016.

Opening timeline

Stations

Station details

Xingke Ave. station
Xingke Ave. station is located in the Yubei District. The station opened on January 25, 2022. There are four exits for this station. Currently only two exits (numbered 1 and 3) are opening.

Gallery

References 

 
Railway lines opened in 2022
2022 establishments in China